The 1996 Northeast Conference baseball tournament was held in May 1996 at Moody Park in Ewing Township, New Jersey.  The league's top four teams competed in the double elimination tournament.  Top-seeded  won their third consecutive, and final, tournament championship.  They then lost a play-in series to Princeton for the right to play in the 1996 NCAA Division I baseball tournament.

Seeding and format
The top four finishers were seeded one through four based on conference regular-season winning percentage.  They played a double-elimination tournament.

Bracket

Most Valuable Player
Jim Gordon of Rider was named Tournament Most Valuable Player.

References

Tournament
Northeast Conference Baseball Tournament
Northeast Conference baseball tournament
Northeast Conference baseball tournament